The Futurity Stakes, commonly referred to as the Belmont Futurity, is an American Thoroughbred horse race run annually in mid-September or October at Belmont Park in Elmont, New York, United States. Open to two-year-old horses, it is raced on turf over a distance of six furlongs.

The creation of James G. K. Lawrence, president of the Sheepshead Bay Race Track, the Futurity was originally run with the two-year-old offspring of mares which had been nominated before their birth. This rule remained in effect until 1957, when the race was opened to all two-year-old horses.

The Futurity was run as a turf race for the first time in 2018. It was added to the Breeders' Cup Challenge series for 2018 as a "Win and You're In" qualifier for the Juvenile Turf Sprint.

Inaugural running
The first edition of the Futurity took place on Labor Day in 1888. The New York Times reported that one quarter of those in attendance were women. The richest race ever run in the United States to that time, the owners of winner Proctor Knott collected $41,675. Until 1956, this race had a larger purse than that of the Belmont Stakes.

Food consumption
The New York Times reported that attendance for the day of the inaugural running was at least the equal of the largest crowd to ever attend a race at the Sheepshead Bay facility and that the caterer sold the following food:

 12,000 pounds of lobster
 600 soft shell crabs
 500 gallons of clam chowder
 960 chickens
 18,000 sandwiches
 50 sets of ribs
 60 short loins
 20 [beef] hips and loins
 25 Spring lambs
 480 squabs
 5 barrels of whiskey
 40 cases of pepper whiskey
 250 kegs of lager
 380 cases of champagne
 30 barrels of imported ginger ale
 600 boxes of soda water, sarsaparilla, and other soft drinks

The Futurity Stakes was hosted by the Sheepshead Bay Race Track until the track's closure following a statewide ban on parimutuel betting through enactment of the Hart–Agnew Law by the New York Legislature. It was switched to the Saratoga Race Course for 1910 but was not raced for the next two years until the State Legislature lifted the ban. Held at Saratoga in 1913 and 1914, it was them moved to Belmont Park. In 1959 and 1960, plus from 1962 to 1967, the race was hosted by the Aqueduct Racetrack before returning to Belmont Park where it has since remained.

The race's counterpart on turf is the Laurel Futurity at Laurel Park Racecourse in Laurel, Maryland. Prior to the advent of the Breeders' Cup Juvenile, the Belmont Futurity was one of the United States' most important dirt races for two-year-olds. Some of the greatest Thoroughbreds in American racing history have won the race including Colin, Native Dancer, Man o' War and U.S. Triple Crown champions Affirmed, Secretariat, and Citation.

In 2001, the race had been scheduled to be run on September 16 but was canceled following the September 11, 2001 attacks.

Over the years the race has been contested at various distances:
 6 furlongs: 1888–1891, 1902–1924, 2011–present;
 1,263 yards and 1 foot: 1892–1901;
 Approximately 7 furlongs: 1925–1933;
 6.5 furlongs: 1934–1975;
 7 furlongs: 1976–1993; 2005–2009.
 8 furlongs: 1994–2004.

Records
Time record: 
 7 furlongs, dirt: 1:21.60 – Affirmed (1977)
  furlongs, dirt: 1:14.40 – Native Dancer (1952) (World-Record Time)
 6 furlongs, dirt: 1:09.49 – Blofeld (2014)
 6 furlongs, turf: 1:08.07 – Four Wheel Drive (2019)

Most wins by an owner:
 5 – James R. Keene (1893, 1899, 1907, 1908, 1909)
 5 – George D. Widener Jr. (1923, 1930, 1950, 1957, 1966)

Most wins by a jockey:
 6 – Eddie Arcaro (1940, 1946, 1950, 1954, 1956, 1959)

Most wins by a trainer:
 9 – James G. Rowe Sr. (1890, 1897, 1899, 1907, 1908, 1909, 1913, 1915, 1921)

Winners

References

The Futurity Stakes at Pedigree Query
April 28, 2001 Thoroughbred Times article on the Futurity Stakes

External links
Video at YouTube of Secretariat winning the 1972 Belmont Futurity
Video at YouTube of Affirmed and Alydar's fourth meeting in the 1977 Belmont Futurity

1888 establishments in New York (state)
Horse races in New York (state)
Belmont Park
Sheepshead Bay Race Track
Flat horse races for two-year-olds
Graded stakes races in the United States
Recurring sporting events established in 1888
Breeders' Cup Challenge series
1888 in American sports